Standard Chartered Uganda, whose official name is Standard Chartered Bank Uganda Limited but is often referred to as Stanchart Uganda, is a commercial bank in Uganda. It is one of the banks licensed by the Bank of Uganda, the central bank and national banking regulator.

Overview
Stanchart Uganda is a large bank serving large corporate clients, upscale retail customers, and medium to large business enterprises. , it was the third largest commercial bank in Uganda by assets, with an asset base of UGX:3.8 trillion (US$1.072 billion), with shareholders' equity of 
UGX:937 billion (US$264 million), behind Stanbic Bank Uganda and Centenary Bank. , Stanchart Uganda owned an estimated 16.2 percent of total bank assets in the country. Other credible sources have put the bank's total assets at UGX:3.3 trillion (US$892.1 million), as of February 2017.

History
Founded in August 1912, Stanchart Uganda is the oldest commercial bank in the country and has maintained a continuous banking presence in the country since its founding. In 1998, Stanchart Uganda acquired four branches of the former Uganda Cooperative Bank. As of May 2018, Stanchart Uganda had 9 branches and 29 automated teller machines and employed over 600 people.

Ownership
Stanchart Uganda is a wholly owned subsidiary of the Standard Chartered Bank Group, an international financial services conglomerate, headquartered in London in the United Kingdom.

Branch network
, the bank had a network of interconnected branches at the following locations, arranged alphabetically:

 Lugogo Branch: Forest Mall, 2-8 Lugogo Bypass Road, Lugogo, Kampala
 Acacia Branch: Acacia Shopping Mall, Kololo, Kampala
 City Branch - 9 William Street, Kampala
 Jinja Branch - 2-4 Grant Road, Jinja
 Freedom City Branch - 4010 Kampala-Entebbe Road, Namasuba, Kampala
 Garden City Branch - Garden City Shopping Mall, 64-84 Yusuf Lule Road, Kampala
 Speke Road Branch - 5 Speke Road, Kampala Head Office
 Kikuubo Branch - Kikuubo Lane, Kampala
 Village Mall Branch - Village Mall, 3 Bandali Rise, Bugoloobi, Kampala

Governance
The chairman of the board of directors is Robin Kibuuka. The managing director is Albert Saltson. Saltson is a native of Ghana and he served as the managing director and chief executive officer of Standard Chartered Gambia, prior to re-assignment to Uganda. During his more than 25 years at Standard Chartered, he has had stints in Ghana and Sierra Leone.

See also

References

External links
 Standard Chartered Bank Uganda Homepage
 Bank of Uganda Website
 Standard Chartered reports strongest profits since 2016 As of 24 May 2020.

Banks of Uganda
Banks established in 1912
Companies based in Kampala
Standard Chartered
1912 establishments in Uganda